Cross Creek may refer to:

Media
Cross Creek (book), a 1942 memoir by Marjorie Kinnan Rawlings
Cross Creek (film), a 1983 film starring Mary Steenburgen

Places in the United States

Cross Creek (Florida), a waterway connecting Orange Lake and Lochloosa Lake in southeastern Alachua County
Cross Creek, Florida, a community centered on the Cross Creek waterway
Cross Creek Township, Jefferson County, Ohio
Cross Creek Township, Washington County, Pennsylvania
Cross Creeks National Wildlife Refuge in Stewart County, Tennessee
Cross Creek Wildlife Management Area, in Brooke County, West Virginia

Other
Cross Creek Cemetery, a cemetery in Fayetteville, North Carolina
Cross Creek High School, located in South Augusta, Georgia
Cross Creek Mall, a shopping mall in Fayetteville, North Carolina
Cross Creek Pictures, a film production company
Cross Creek Programs, a therapeutic boarding school in La Verkin, Utah
Cross Creek Railroad, an extension in Ohio of the Pittsburgh and West Virginia Railway
Cross Creek railway station, a station located in the Wellington region of New Zealand's North Island
Cross Creek Trail, a hiking trail in Colorado
Cross Creek (Ohio River tributary), a stream in Brooke County, West Virginia